Relax is a suite of self-improvement software written by Kelly Jones and Bill Williams for the Atari 8-bit family and published by Synapse Software in 1984. Subtitled "The Stress Reduction System", Relax uses a headband containing sensors attached to electromyograph hardware to provide audio/visual feedback in three interactive programs. It also includes a 25-minute cassette tape of guided relaxation.

Gameplay
Relax is a package of three programs: a continuous graph of the user's level of tension; a program that produces kaleidoscopic patterns and tones that change color; and a game which requires the player to use tension and relaxation by changing the level of tension to win using a headband that monitors the player's muscle tension.

Reception
Roy Wagner reviewed the game for Computer Gaming World, and stated that "Next time you've played a stressful game or have too many hours at the joystick, before you shot off your computer, load this program and r-e-l-a-x-x-x-...."

References

External links
Review in Compute!
Review in Antic
Review in Commodore Microcomputers
Review in PC World

1984 video games
Atari 8-bit family games
Atari 8-bit family-only games
Atari 8-bit family software
Health video games
Non-games
Synapse Software games
Video games developed in the United States